McNeer House is a historic home located near Salt Sulphur Springs, Monroe County, West Virginia. It was built in 1919, and is a 2½-story white frame dwelling in the Colonial Revival style. It has a rear service area that features a two-story, "U"-shaped wing with a one-story rear portico with Doric order columns between the arms of the U. It features a two-story flat-roofed portico supported by four Doric columns, across the central bay of the front elevation. The house was built by E. Grier Kendall, but may have been designed by Alex B. Mahood from nearby Bluefield, West Virginia.  It is the largest residential building in Monroe County.  For a short time after World War II, the McNeer House became the "Lotus Club," perhaps Monroe County's only nightclub.

It was listed on the National Register of Historic Places in 1991.

References

Houses on the National Register of Historic Places in West Virginia
Colonial Revival architecture in West Virginia
Houses completed in 1919
Houses in Monroe County, West Virginia
National Register of Historic Places in Monroe County, West Virginia